St. Joost School of Art and Design (formerly Academy of Art and Design St. Joost, Dutch Akademie voor Kunst en Vormgeving St. Joost, Breda) is a Dutch academy of art and design based in Breda and 's-Hertogenbosch. The school is part of Avans University of Applied Sciences with offices in Breda, 's-Hertogenbosch and Tilburg.

Location 

The location in Breda is a former seminary on the outskirts of the city. 

The school's location in 's-Hertogenbosch is a stone's throw from the railway station. It is a remnant of the school that was originally called Royal Academy of Arts and Design, 's-Hertogenbosch. Up to 2017 this school was situated in the former Remington-typewriter factory on the Onderwijsboulevard. This building is a remarkable design by architect Hugh Maaskant, and especially suitable for a school that requires much natural light. The school was next moved to the EKP building, its current (2018) location. This is a building where mail and packages were handled, located along the railway track just north of the station.

History

Predecessors 
The longest part of the history of AKV St. Joost is formed by the history of its two predecessors: the Royal Academy of Arts and Design of 's-Hertogenbosch, and the Academy for Visual Arts Sint-Joost in Breda. 

The school in 's-Hertogenbosch was founded in 1812 as "Royal and Imperial Academy of Painting, Sculpture and Architecture". The oldest roots of St. Joost were in a drawing school started in Breda in 1825. In 1922 an art school was founded in Breda, and later the Free Academy of Visual Art was founded by the artists Dio Rovers, Gerrit de Morée and Niel Steenbergen. These two schools became locations of the new merged school in 2004.

Bachelor courses 
Full time
 Visual Arts (Breda and 's-Hertogenbosch)
 Fine arts (Breda)
 Graphic Design (Breda and 's-Hertogenbosch)
 Illustration (Breda and 's-Hertogenbosch)
 Photography (Breda)
 Animation (Breda)
 Audiovisual Design (Breda)
 Spatial Design (Breda)
 Interaction Design (Breda)
All full-time courses start with a foundation year.

Part time
 Fine arts
 Graphic Design
 Photography
 Spatial Design

The time courses Visual Arts, Photography and Audiovisual Design are given in 's-Hertogenbosch, the part-time course Graphic Design and Spatial Design in Breda.

In addition, the school under the name Post-St. Joost three continued to master: Photography, Fine Art and Graphic Design.
Known lecturers or alumni

Masters courses 
The school offers four masters programmes through the Masters Institute of Visual Cultures:

 Animation
 Ecology Futures
 Situated Design
 Visual Arts & Post-Contemporary Practice

Notable faculty and alumni 
 Chris Berens
 Evert Bloemsma
 Clemens van den Broeck
 Wim Crouwel
 Marlies Dekkers
 Jan van den Dobbelsteen
 Eugene Horak
Rachel de Joode
 Ruud Kuijer
 Johan van Loon
 Geert Lap
 Awoiska van der Molen
 Jan van Munster
 Gert Staal

References

External links 
AKV St. Joost

Art schools in the Netherlands